Harpinae is a subfamily of sea snails within the family Harpidae.

Genera
Austroharpa Finlay, 1931
 † Eocithara P. Fischer, 1883 
Harpa Röding, 1798
Synonyms
 † Deniharpa Iredale, 1931: synonym of Austroharpa Finlay, 1931 (unavailable name: no description)
 Harpalis Link, 1807: synonym of Harpa Röding, 1798
 Palamharpa Iredale, 1931: synonym of Austroharpa Finlay, 1931 
 † Refluharpa Iredale, 1931: synonym of † Eocithara (Refluharpa) Rehder, 1973: synonym of † Eocithara P. Fischer, 1883 (unavailable name: no description)
 † Trameharpa Iredale, 1931: synonym of  Austroharpa Finlay, 1931  (unavailable name: no description

References

 Poppe G.T., Brulet T. & Dance S.P. (1999). The family Harpidae. Conchological Iconography. ConchBooks, Hackenheim. 69pp.
 Bouchet P., Rocroi J.P., Hausdorf B., Kaim A., Kano Y., Nützel A., Parkhaev P., Schrödl M. & Strong E.E. (2017). Revised classification, nomenclator and typification of gastropod and monoplacophoran families. Malacologia. 61(1-2): 1-526.

External links
  Rehder H.A. (1973). The family Harpidae of the world. Indo-Pacific Mollusca 3(16) : 207-274

Harpidae